Fung Chi Ming (born 13 January 1951) is a Hong Kong former football player. He played the position of a striker or right winger and won the Hong Kong First Division League Best Scorer Award twice in 1976-77 and 77–78.

Nicknamed "Fung Little" (馮細), he was called the 3A's of Hong Kong national football team together with Wan Chi Keung and Sze Kin Hei.

He got famous when he played in South China. In 1978–79, together with his teammates Choi York Yee and Chan Sai Kau, they moved to Happy Valley by each signing a big contract of HKD$5,500 per month. However, Fung could not maintain his form and moved back to South China after two seasons.

References
 www.GoalGoalGoal.com 前港隊及南華名將馮志明 (in Chinese)
 www.GoalGoalGoal.com 陳世九 (in Chinese)

External links
 HKFA Website 一場扣人心弦的亞洲盃賽事─香港對北韓 (in Chinese)

1951 births
Hong Kong footballers
Association football forwards
Hong Kong First Division League players
South China AA players
Happy Valley AA players
Living people